"Wind song" is a popular song by Ruslana (winner of the Eurovision Song Contest 2004). Ruslana performed the song during the Orange revolution in Ukraine.

Chart performance

Ruslana songs
Year of song missing
Songs written by Ruslana